The women's singles Badminton event at the 2017 Summer Universiade was held from August 27 to 29 at the Taipei Gymnasium in Taipei, Taiwan.

Draw

Finals

Top half

Section 1

Section 2

Bottom half

Section 3

Section 4 

Remark : Ret=Retired

References
Draw

Women's singles
Univ